Protidan is a 1983 Bengali action film directed by Prabhat Roy with Victor Banerjee, Naseeruddin Shah, Sharmila Tagore, Lily Chakravarty and Ranjit Mallick in lead roles.

Cast
Victor Banerjee
Naseeruddin Shah    
Sharmila Tagore
Lily Chakraborty

References

External links

1983 films
Bengali-language Indian films
1980s Bengali-language films
Films directed by Prabhat Roy